Veltpunch is a Japanese alternative rock band which formed in 1997. They played at the SXSW music festival in Austin, Texas, USA, in March 2000. Their first major single, "Crawl", reached number 36 on the Oricon single charts in 2008 and remained on the chart for seven weeks. Crawl was also featured as an opening theme for the anime Nabari no Ou.

Members
  (Vocals, guitar)
  (Bass, vocals)
  (Drums) [1997 – 2010]
  (Guitar) [1997 – 2012]
  (Drums) [2011–present]

Discography

Singles
 "Crawl" (May 21, 2008) Oricon Style Single ranking: No. 36

Albums
 Repeat 2000 Times (Mar 21, 2000)
 When We Drive (Mar 21, 2002)
 Question No. 13 (Dec 15, 2004)
 A Huge Mistake (Oct 5, 2005, 2nd Release Nov 3, 2006)
 White Album (Aug 1, 2007)
 Paint Your Life Grey (Mar 9, 2008)
 Black Album (Feb 17, 2010)
 His Strange Fighting Pose (Aug 3, 2011)
 THE NEWEST JOKE (Jul 20, 2016)
 SUICIDE KING (Aug 5, 2020)

Best albums
 Gold Album 1997–2012 (Aug 8, 2012)

References

External links
  

Japanese rock music groups
Japanese alternative rock groups
Musical groups established in 1997
1997 establishments in Japan